Vernon Huber (August 28, 1899 – June 17, 1967) was a United States Navy rear admiral, and the governor of American Samoa from April 22, 1947, to June 15, 1949. He was born in Philadelphia, Illinois, and was appointed to the United States Naval Academy from that state. He served as the first commanding officer of the destroyer  upon its launch in 1940. After his appointment, he advocated the diversification of the American Samoan economy. He also helped to increase the level American Samoan self-government, and was the first governor to serve alongside a Samoan legislature, the American Samoa Fono.

Life
Huber was born on August 28, 1899, in Philadelphia, Illinois, to parents Herbert Oliver and Nelle Davis Huber. On December 27, 1927, he married Ida Brown. Upon arriving at the El Camino Hospital in Los Altos, California, on June 16, 1967, Huber was pronounced dead.

Naval career
Huber was appointed to the United States Naval Academy on July 17, 1918. He was the first commander of the destroyer  upon its launch in 1940.

Governorship
On August 22, 1947, Huber relieved Harold Houser and took the office of Governor of American Samoa. His assistant governor was Ralph Ramey.

Huber supported the opening of a cannery by famed aviator Harold Gatty, believing it would help diversify the American Samoan economy.

During his term, the Samoans moved towards greater self-government. Under Huber's encouragement, the legislature of the territory, the American Samoa Fono, convened for the first time. As governor, Huber maintained certain powers over the legislature, including the power of veto. This reversed the previous position of Governor Otto Dowling, who had claimed an act of the United States Congress would be required to form a legislature. He ceded the office to Thomas Francis Darden Jr. on June 15, 1949.

References

1899 births
1967 deaths
People from Cass County, Illinois
Governors of American Samoa
United States Navy admirals
United States Navy personnel of World War I
United States Navy personnel of World War II
United States Naval Academy alumni
Recipients of the Legion of Merit
Military personnel from Illinois